Frewin may refer to:

People
 Anthony Frewin (born 1947), writer and personal assistant to Stanley Kubrick
 Greg Frewin (born 1967), Canadian illusionist and magician
 Richard Frewin (1681?–1761), English physician and professor of history

Other
 Frewin Hall at St Mary's College, Oxford